The spine-bellied sea snake (Hydrophis hardwickii), also commonly known as Hardwicke's sea snake and Hardwicke's spine-bellied sea snake, is a species of venomous sea snake in the family Elapidae.

Etymology
The specific name, hardwickii, is in honor of English naturalist Thomas Hardwicke.

Description
H. hardwickii has the following characteristics.
Body short, stout, neck region not less than half as thick at midbody;
head large; scales squarish or hexagonal, juxtaposed, outer 3-4 rows larger than others, scale rows: males 23-31 around neck, females 27-35, around midbody, males 25-27, females 33-41;
ventrals small, usually distinct anteriorly, not so posteriorly, in  males 114-186, in  females 141-230; head shields entire, parietals occasionally divided;
nostrils superior, nasals in contact with one another;
prefrontal usually in contact with second upper labial;
7-8 upper labials, 3-4 bordering eye; 1 pre- and 1-2 postoculars; 2, rarely 3, anterior temporals; greenish or yellow- olive above, whitish below, 35-50 olive to dark gray dorsal bars, tapering to a point laterally, occasionally encircling body, a narrow dark ventral stripe or broad irregular band occasionally present;
adults often lack any pattern and are uniform olive to dark gray;
head pale olive to black, yellow markings on snout present or not. Total length 860 mm (2' 4"), tail length 85 mm (3.3").

Geographic range
H. hardwickii is located in warm waters:
Persian Gulf (United Arab Emirates, Iran)
Indian Ocean (Bangladesh, Burma, Pakistan, Sri Lanka, India)
South China Sea north to the coasts of Fujian and Shandong
Strait of Taiwan
Indoaustralian Archipelago
North coast of Australia (Northern Territory, Queensland, Western Australia)
Philippines, Cambodia. 
Pacific Ocean (Thailand, Indonesia, China, Japan, Papua New Guinea)

References

Further reading
Boulenger GA (1896). Catalogue of the Snakes in the British Museum (Natural History). Volume III., Containing the Colubridæ (Opisthogylyphæ and Proteroglyphæ) ... London: Trustees of the British Museum (Natural History). (Taylor and Francis, printers). xiv + 727 pp. + Plates I-XXV. (Enhydris hardwickii, p. 301).
Gray JE (1835). Illustrations of Indian Zoology, chiefly selected from the collection of Major - General Hardwicke. Vol. 2. London (1833-1834): 263 pp., 95 plates. (Lapemis hardwickii, new species, Plate 87, Figure 2).
Gray JE (1843). "Description of two new species of reptiles from the collection made during the voyages of H.M.S. Sulphur." Ann. Mag. Nat. Hist. [First Series] 11: 46.
Gritis P, Voris HK (1990). "Variability and significance of parietal and ventral scales in the marine snakes of the genus Lapemis (Serpentes: Hydrophiidae), with comments on the occurrence of spiny scales in the genus." Fieldiana Zool., New Series (56): i-iii + 1-13.
Günther ACLG (1864). The Reptiles of British India. London: The Ray Society. (Taylor and Francis, printers). xxvii + 452 pp. + Plates I-XXVI. (Hydrophis hardwickii, p. 380 + Plate XXV, figure W).
Leviton AE, Wogan GOU, Koo MS, Zug GR, Lucas RS, Vindum JV (2003). "The Dangerously Venomous Snakes of Myanmar: Illustrated Checklist with Keys". Proc. California Acad. Sci. 54 (24): 407-462. (Lapemis hardwickii, p. 436).
Smith MA (1943). The Fauna of British India, Ceylon and Burma, Including the Whole of the Indo-Chinese Sub-region. Reptilia and Amphibia. Vol. III.—Serpentes. London: Secretary of State for India. (Taylor and Francis, printers). xii + 583 pp. (Lapemis hardwickii, pp. 468–470, Figures 148 & 149).

External links
 SnakeDatabase (http://snakedatabase.org/species/Hydrophis/hardwickii).

Hydrophis
Reptiles of Western Australia
Reptiles described in 1834
Taxa named by John Edward Gray
Snakes of Australia